Eduard "Edi" Federer (20 February 1955 in Mühlbach am Hochkönig– 30 May 2012 in Pfarrwerfen) was an Austrian ski jumper. At the Four Hills Tournament 1974–75 he finished second.

References

1955 births
2012 deaths
Austrian male ski jumpers
People from St. Johann im Pongau District
Sportspeople from Salzburg (state)